Noel Cox  (born 3 June 1965) is a New Zealand-born lawyer, legal scholar, and Anglican priest.

Personal
Cox was raised in Auckland, New Zealand.  He is an advocate of the monarchy in New Zealand.

Career
Cox earned an LLB and an LLM degree from the University of Auckland, an MTh degree, an MA degree in ecclesiastical law, an LTh from the University of Wales Lampeter, and a PhD degree in Political Studies from the University of Auckland. His doctoral thesis was titled The evolution of the New Zealand monarchy: The recognition of an autochthonous polity. His main field of research has been constitutional law. In 2004 he was elected a Fellow of the Royal Historical Society (FRHistS) for his work on Commonwealth jurisprudence.

Starting in 2010 he was a professor and Head of the Department of Law and Criminology at Aberystwyth University, Wales,  but was dismissed on May 22, 2014, due to alleged breaches of University financial and data protection regulations, and according to a statement by the university, a breach of the University's duty of care towards a member of staff.

He was ordained as a deacon in the Church in Wales in June 2012 and a priest in June 2013.

Rev Cox is the Mission to Seafarers Chaplain at the Port of Auckland.

Publications

Cox authored over 100 academic papers and a number of books.  Among them: 
 The Royal Prerogative and Constitutional Law: A search for the quintessence of executive power (Routledge, Abingdon, 2020;) 272 pages;
 Priest of the Church or Priest of a Church? The Ecclesiology of Ordained Local Ministry (Rowman & Littlefield Ltd, London,  2021) 172 pages;
 Technology and Legal Systems (Ashgate Publishing Ltd, Aldershot, 2006) 267 pages;
 A Constitutional History of the New Zealand Monarchy: The evolution of the New Zealand monarchy and the recognition of an autochthonous polity (V.D.M. Verlag Dr. Müller Aktiengesellschaft & Co. K.G., Saarbrücken, 2008) 332 pages;
 Church and State in the Post-Colonial Era: The Anglican Church and the Constitution in New Zealand (Polygraphia (NZ) Ltd, Auckland, 2008) 338 pages;
 The catholicity of ordained ministry in the Anglican Communion: An examination of the ecclesiology implicit in the validity of orders debate (V.D.M. Verlag Dr. Müller Aktiengesellschaft & Co. K.G., Saarbrücken, 2009) 168 pages;
 Academical Dress in New Zealand: A Study (V.D.M. Verlag Dr. Müller Aktiengesellschaft & Co. K.G., Saarbrücken, 2010) 284 pages;
 Constitutional paradigms and the stability of states (Ashgate Publishing Ltd, Farnham, 2012) 306 pages.

References 

Living people
1965 births
Holders of a Lambeth degree
University of Auckland alumni
People from Auckland
New Zealand Anglican priests
New Zealand monarchists
Fellows of the Royal Historical Society